The Geelong Football Club is an Australian rules football club based in Geelong, Victoria. Since becoming a foundation club of the Victorian Football League (VFL)—which is now known as the Australian Football League (AFL)—in 1897, the club has participated in every season of the competition except the 1916, 1942 and 1943 seasons, where the club did not field teams due to World War I (1916) and World War II (1942 and 1943). In 118 completed seasons, Geelong has contested eighteen VFL/AFL Grand Finals, winning nine premierships.

Seasons

Senior

VFA (1877–1896)

VFL/AFL (1897–present)

Notes

References 

Australian rules football-related lists
Geelong-related lists